Kosovo during the Second World War was in a very dramatic period, because different currents clashed, bringing constant tensions within it. During World War II, the region of Kosovo was split into three occupational zones: Italian, German, and Bulgarian. Partisans from Albania and Yugoslavia led the fight for Kosovo's independence from the invader and his allies.

Overview 
Yugoslavia was conquered by the Axis in April 1941 and divided mainly between Italy and Germany. Kosovo was included mainly in the Italian controlled area and was united to fascist Albania between 1941 and 1943.

After the Axis invasion of Yugoslavia in 1941, most of Kosovo was assigned to Italian-controlled Albania, with the rest being controlled by Germany and Bulgaria. A three-dimensional conflict ensued, involving inter-ethnic, ideological, and international affiliations, with the first being most important.

Mustafa Kruja, the then-Prime Minister of Albania, was in Kosovo in June 1942, and at a meeting with the Albanian leaders of Kosovo, he said: "We should endeavor to ensure that the Serb population of Kosovo be – the area be cleansed of them and all Serbs who had been living there for centuries should be termed colonialists and sent to concentration camps in Albania. The Serb settlers should be killed." It is estimated that at least 10,000 Serbs were massacred and a further 200,000 expelled from Kosovo during WW2. In the Nuremberg trials, it was established that the SS Skanderbeg committed crimes against humanity in Kosovo against ethnic Serbs, Jews, and Roma.

During the New Year's Eve between 1943 and 1944, Albanian and Yugoslav partisans gathered at the town of Bujan, near Kukës in northern Albania, where they held a conference in which they discussed the fate of Kosovo after the war. Both Albanian and Yugoslav communists signed the agreement, according to which Kosovo would have the right to democratically decide whether it wants to remain in Albania or become part of Serbia. This was seen as the marxist solution for Kosovo. The agreement was not respected by Yugoslavia, since Tito knew that Serbia would not accept it. Some Albanians, especially in the region in and around Drenica in central Kosovo revolted against the Yugoslav communists for not respecting the agreement. In response, the Yugoslavs called the rebels Nazi and Fascist collaborators and responded with violence. The Albanian Kosovar military leader Shaban Polluzha, who first fought with Yugoslav partisans but then refused to collaborate further, was attacked and killed. Between 400 and 2,000 Kosovar Albanian recruits of the Yugoslav Army were shot in Bar.

After the surrender of the Kingdom of Italy in September 1943, the German forces took over direct control of the region. In September 1944 the Soviet Union declared war on Bulgaria and occupied part of the country. A coup d'état on 9 September led to Bulgaria joining the Soviets. As result in the early October three Bulgarian armies, consisting of around 340,000-man, together with the Red Army entered occupied Yugoslavia and moved from Sofia to Niš, Skopje and Pristina to blocking the German forces withdrawing from Greece. The Bulgarians operated in conjunction with the Yugoslav and Albanian communist partisans. Kosovo was liberated by the end of November. It became a province of Serbia within the Democratic Federal Yugoslavia. The Kosovo Albanians, who had been promised self-determination if they joined the partisans, rebelled and martial law was declared. It took about six months for the area to be pacified after some 20,000 Albanians under Shaban Polluza resisted integration of Kosovo within Yugoslavia.

See also 
 History of Kosovo
 Kosovo Operation (1944)
 Kosovo during World War I
 20th-century history of Kosovo

References 

Modern history of Kosovo
Kosovo in World War II
Yugoslavia in World War II
Wars involving Albania